Norbert Szemerédi (born 8 December 1993) is a Hungarian football player who plays for BVSC.

Club statistics

Updated to games played as of 4 March 2020.

References
MLSZ
HLSZ

1993 births
Living people
People from Szekszárd
Hungarian footballers
Association football goalkeepers
Budapest Honvéd FC players
Paksi FC players
Dorogi FC footballers
Szeged-Csanád Grosics Akadémia footballers
Zalaegerszegi TE players
Kazincbarcikai SC footballers
Budapesti VSC footballers
Nemzeti Bajnokság I players
Nemzeti Bajnokság II players
Sportspeople from Tolna County